Unida/Dozer is a split EP featuring the stoner rock bands Dozer and Unida. It is one of the first releases for both bands. It was released in 1999 by MeteorCity and re-issued in 2006. 

The first press of the vinyl version is limited to 1,000 copies on red vinyl. The second press is also only 1,000 copies but on marbled white and black vinyl. Both vinyl versions come with a poster advertising the Unida/Dozer split EP and Nebula/Lowrider split EP as well as the Unida/Nebula 1999 Tour.

Track listing

Personnel
 John Garcia – vocals
 Dave Dinsmore – bass
 Arthur Seay – guitars
 Miguel Cancino – drums

References

1999 EPs
Dozer albums
Unida albums
MeteorCity albums
Split EPs